Eugen Teodor Radu (born 16 April 1978) is a Romanian luger who has competed since 1994. He was born in Tulcea.

Competing in two Winter Olympics, he earned his best finish of 15th in the men's doubles event both in 2002 and 2006. Radu's best finish at the FIL World Luge Championships was 14th in the men's doubles event at Nagano in 2004.

Notes

References
 2002 luge men's singles results (todor66.com)
 2002 luge men's doubles results (todor66.com)
 2006 luge men's doubles results (todor66.com)

External links 
 
 
 

1978 births
Living people
Romanian male lugers
Olympic lugers of Romania
Lugers at the 2002 Winter Olympics
Lugers at the 2006 Winter Olympics
People from Tulcea